Johanna Hagström (born 27 March 1998) is a Swedish cross-country skier that represents the club Ulricehamns IF SK.

Hagström made her World Cup debut in January 2017 and scored her first podium in Cogne, Italy, in February 2019, by finishing third in the freestyle sprint competition. In 2021, she participated in the World Championships in Oberstdorf, finishing fourth in the individual sprint.

Her sister Sara Hagström is an orienteering competitor.

Cross-country skiing results
All results are sourced from the International Ski Federation (FIS).

World Championships

World Cup

Season standings

Individual podiums
 6 podiums – (5 , 1 )

References

External links

1998 births
Living people
Swedish female cross-country skiers
Cross-country skiers from Västra Götaland County
People from Falköping Municipality
Cross-country skiers at the 2016 Winter Youth Olympics
Youth Olympic gold medalists for Sweden
21st-century Swedish women